Richard Botlo is a Czechoslovak sprint canoer who competed in the early 1990s. He won a bronze medal in the K-4 1000 m event at the 1991 ICF Canoe Sprint World Championships in Paris.

References

Czechoslovak male canoeists
Living people
Year of birth missing (living people)
ICF Canoe Sprint World Championships medalists in kayak